Protopterna is a genus of moths belonging to the subfamily Tortricinae of the family Tortricidae.

Species
Protopterna chalybias Meyrick, 1908
Protopterna citrophanes Meyrick, 1921
Protopterna eremia Yasuda & Razowski, 1991

See also
List of Tortricidae genera

References

External links
tortricidae.com

Cnephasiini
Tortricidae genera